Walter T. Brown (born August 1937) is a young Earth creationist, who is the director of his own ministry called the Center for Scientific Creation. The Skeptic's Dictionary considers him to be one of the leaders of the creation science movement. He proposes a specific version of flood geology called the Hydroplate Theory. He is a retired army officer with a degree in mechanical engineering.

Biography 
Brown has a B.S. from West Point, a Ph.D. in mechanical engineering from the Massachusetts Institute of Technology, (1967), and he served as an officer in the United States military until he retired in 1980.

Since retiring from the military, Brown has been the director of his "Center for Scientific Creation" and has done his own research, writing, and speaking on origins theory. In 1998, Brown was appointed to a committee reviewing Arizona's state science standards. Evolution was retained in the Arizona state science standards after a final decision in August 1998.

Creationist theory
In Brown's In the Beginning: Compelling Evidence for Creation and the Flood he suggests evidence against evolution and for creation science and flood geology (including hydroplates). It is divided into three sections, the first of which explores discoveries made by scientists that do not fit the theory of evolution. The second section outlines various alternate explanations to geological and astronomical subjects such as the mid-oceanic ridge and comets, which Brown states evolutionary science cannot explain. The final section presents a variety of other questions encountered in the creation–evolution controversy.

In 1989, the Creation/Evolution journal of the National Center for Science Education published a critique of Brown's theory. Jim Lippard, graduate student of philosophy begins with a criticism focusing primarily on fossil evidence of human evolution. Brown addressed several of Lippard's points in his response, and three further articles were printed: Lippard, Brown, and ending with Lippard, where he asserts that Brown made serious errors, including using "mistaken claims about what others have written." The series of articles does not discuss Brown's hydroplates, apart from Brown's claim that Lippard "dismisses or ignores the bulk of the book and specifically addresses only a very small fraction of its substance."

Robert T. Pennock has described Brown's position as being typical, other than the unique feature of his hydroplates hypothesis, of young-earth creationist's explaining all major terrestrial features in terms of a catastrophic Biblical flood.

Hydroplate theory

The most distinctive feature of Brown's theories, compared to other creationist theories, are the hydroplates. He claims that, prior to the Flood of Noah, there was an enormous amount of water underneath the crust of the Earth, and that this water pressurizing, shattering the crust, and breaking it into plates was both part of the Flood and created the continental plates that mainstream geology associates with plate tectonics. Because the plates are, in this theory, formed by the action of water, he calls them "hydroplates" and gives their name to the theory.

Reception

Walt Brown has had contentious relations with other creationist organizations. The young earth creationist organization, Answers in Genesis has a standing offer to Brown to publish some of his material in their journals but Brown has declined. The old earth creationist organization, Answers in Creation has published material rebutting Brown's hydroplate theory. The Christian American Scientific Affiliation website features a video critical of Brown's video "God's Power and Scripture's Authority" by Steven H. Schimmrich of Kutztown University. 
  
Brown has stated that no "evolutionist" will publicly debate with him, but has been accused by opponents of complicating such debates. An abortive attempt at such a debate was held in 1989 and 1990 in the pages of Creation/Evolution, the  National Center for Science Education journal, before Brown refused to continue. Joe Meert of Gondwana Research, a journal promoting research related to the origin and evolution of continents, alleges he "signed a contract" for such a debate with Brown in 2000. He claims Brown disputed the terms of the contract and it did not take place. Brown stated on his website that the actual reason for the debate not taking place was that the Meert wanted to add religion and since Dr. Brown is not a theologian, he wanted the debate to be strictly science. According to Georgia State University biology professor Fred K. Parrish, who afterwards claimed he was "tricked" into an April 1985 public debate with Brown, claims Brown has a set of preconditions (such as Brown speaks first, the debate moderator sits on his side, and all debate material would be scientific, not religious in nature).

Bibliography
In the Beginning: Compelling Evidence for Creation and the Flood, Center for Scientific Creation (7th edn ).

References

External links 
 Center for Scientific Creation
 CH420: Hydroplate claim
 A Few Silly Flaws In Walter Brown's Hydroplate Theory by Joyce Arthur
 A Critique of Walter Brown's Hydroplate Model by Glen Kuban

1937 births
American Christian Young Earth creationists
Living people
MIT School of Engineering alumni